Sören Karlsson (born 23 October 1946) is a former international speedway rider from Sweden.

Speedway career 
Karlsson won a bronze medal at the Speedway World Team Cup in the 1975 Speedway World Team Cup.

He rode in the top tier of British Speedway from 1973 to 1978, riding for various clubs.

World final appearances

World Team Cup
 1975 –  Norden, Motodrom Halbemond (with Tommy Jansson / Bernt Persson / Sören Sjösten / Anders Michanek) – 3rd – 17pts
 1977 -  Wrocław, Olympic Stadium (with Bengt Jansson / Anders Michanek / Tommy Nilsson / Bernt Persson) - 4th - 11pts (0)

References 

1946 births
Swedish speedway riders
Coventry Bees riders
Sheffield Tigers riders
Swindon Robins riders
Living people
Sportspeople from Örebro